Googins is a surname. Notable people with the surname include:

Scott Googins, American college baseball coach 
William Googins (1838–1926), American Civil War veteran